Vanikoro cuvieriana is a species of very small sea snail, a marine gastropod mollusk in the family Vanikoridae.

Description
The size of an adult shell varies between 2.5 mm and 10 mm.

Distribution
This marine species is distributed in the Indian Ocean along the Mascarene Basin and in the Central Pacific Ocean.

References

 Drivas, J. & M. Jay (1988). Coquillages de La Réunion et de l'île Maurice
 Kabat A.R., Finet Y. & Way K. (1997) Catalogue of the Naticidae (Mollusca: Gastropoda) described by C.A. Récluz, including the location of the type specimens. Apex 12(1): 15-26

External links
 

Vanikoridae
Gastropods described in 1845